Vanessa Boubryemm (born 16 January 1982 in Tourcoing) is an amateur French freestyle wrestler, who played for the women's flyweight category. She is a three-time national wrestling champion, a two-time medalist at the World Championships, and a three-time medalist for the 48 and 51 kg classes at the European Championships. She also won a gold medal in the women's 51 kg division at the 2005 Mediterranean Games in Almería, Spain. Boubryemm is a member of Lutte Club Tourcoing, and is currently coached and trained by Nodar Bokashvili.

Boubryemm represented France at the 2008 Summer Olympics in Beijing, where she competed for the women's 48 kg class. She defeated Venezuela's Mayelis Caripá and Russia's Zamira Rakhmanova in the preliminaries, before losing out the quarterfinal match to U.S. wrestler Clarissa Chun, with a two-set technical score (1–6, 2–6), and a classification point score of 1–3.

References

External links
Profile – International Wrestling Database
Profile – French Olympic Profile 
NBC 2008 Olympics profile

French female sport wrestlers
1982 births
Living people
Olympic wrestlers of France
Wrestlers at the 2008 Summer Olympics
Sportspeople from Tourcoing
World Wrestling Championships medalists
Mediterranean Games gold medalists for France
Competitors at the 2005 Mediterranean Games
Mediterranean Games medalists in wrestling
20th-century French women
21st-century French women